Álvaro Medrán Just (born 15 March 1994) is a Spanish professional footballer who plays for Saudi Professional League club Al Taawoun FC as a midfielder.

He began his career with Real Madrid, going through the club's academy and later playing five matches with the first team; he was also loaned to Getafe before being released. He signed for Valencia in July 2016, serving loans at Alavés and Rayo Vallecano.

Medrán represented Spain at youth level.

Club career

Real Madrid
Born in Dos Torres, Province of Córdoba, Medrán joined Real Madrid's youth setup in 2011, aged 17. After being promoted to the C team the following year he played his first match as a senior on 23 February 2014, coming on as a second-half substitute in a 2–0 away win against Real Zaragoza for the reserves in the Segunda División. He scored his first professional goals on 31 May, netting a brace in a 2–1 home victory over CE Sabadell FC.

Medrán made his first-team – and La Liga – debut on 18 October 2014, replacing Luka Modrić in the 79th minute of a 5–0 away rout of Levante UD. On 9 December, in his UEFA Champions League maiden appearance, he scored his first senior goal for the club after replacing Gareth Bale in the 83rd minute, netting the last in the 4–0 defeat of PFC Ludogorets Razgrad in the group stage five minutes later. Later that month, he was part of the squad that won the FIFA Club World Cup in Morocco, but did not take to the field.

On 2 July 2015, Medrán was loaned to Getafe CF in a season-long deal. He scored his first goal in the Spanish top flight on 24 April 2016, his team's first in a 2–2 home draw against Valencia CF. He added another on 15 May, but in a 2–1 loss at Real Betis which ensured top-tier relegation after a 12-year stay.

Valencia
On 11 July 2016, Medrán signed a four-year deal with Valencia. On 1 September of the following year, he was loaned to Deportivo Alavés for one season.

Medrán scored his first goal for the latter club on 30 September 2017, helping the visitors to defeat Levante 2–0. After the appointment of new manager Abelardo Fernández in December, however, he was rarely played, which led to the player bursting into tears in a post-match interview following a league fixture at UD Las Palmas in April 2018 where he featured 16 minutes and netted once (4–0).

On 11 August 2018, Medrán was loaned to fellow top-division club Rayo Vallecano for the campaign.

Chicago Fire
On 10 October 2019, Medrán was announced as a new signing by Major League Soccer side Chicago Fire FC ahead of the upcoming season. He made his debut the following 1 March, playing the full 90 minutes of a 2–1 loss at Seattle Sounders FC.  

Medrán left the Soldier Field in November 2021.

Al Taawoun
On 28 December 2021, Medrán joined Al Taawoun FC of the Saudi Professional League.

International career
Medrán won the first and only cap for the Spanish under-21s on 12 November 2014, playing the second half of the 1–4 friendly loss to Belgium in Ferrol.

Career statistics

Honours
Real Madrid
FIFA Club World Cup: 2014

References

External links

1994 births
Living people
Sportspeople from the Province of Córdoba (Spain)
Spanish footballers
Footballers from Andalusia
Association football midfielders
La Liga players
Segunda División players
Segunda División B players
Real Madrid C footballers
Real Madrid Castilla footballers
Real Madrid CF players
Getafe CF footballers
Valencia CF players
Deportivo Alavés players
Rayo Vallecano players
Major League Soccer players
Chicago Fire FC players
Saudi Professional League players
Al-Taawoun FC players
Spain youth international footballers
Spain under-21 international footballers
Spanish expatriate footballers
Expatriate soccer players in the United States
Expatriate footballers in Saudi Arabia
Spanish expatriate sportspeople in the United States
Spanish expatriate sportspeople in Saudi Arabia